Eyeless in Gaza may refer to:

 "Eyeless in Gaza", a quote from John Milton's closet drama Samson Agonistes
 Eyeless in Gaza (novel), 1936 novel by Aldous Huxley, who took the title from Milton's drama
 Eyeless in Gaza (band), English post-punk band